The Austrian Football Bundesliga of 1994–95 was organised by the Austrian Football Association (ÖFB). The Austrian First League served as a stepping stone for promotion to the 1. Bundesliga. The Regional Leagues acted as a third step on the footballing ladder, East (Vienna, Lower Austria and Burgenland), Central (Mitte) (Carinthia, Upper Austria, and Styria) and West (Salzburg, Tirol, and Vorarlberg).

Bundesliga 
The Bundesliga was contest by 10 teams, who played against each other four times. SV Austria Salzburg won the Austrian Football Bundesliga for the second time. As champions they were able to take part in the qualifying rounds of the Champions League the following season, but they were knocked out in the qualifying rounds. Rapid Vienna were able to take part in the UEFA Cup Winners' Cup due to their cup victory, where they played in the final in Brussels. Sturm Graz as well as Austria Vienna represented Austrian football in UEFA Cup 1996, where Austria Vienna made Round 1. FC Tirol Innsbruck, Linz ASK and SK Vorwärts Steyr all took part in the UEFA Intertoto Cup of 1995, where Tirol made the final. VfB Mödling were relegated for finishing bottom. A play-off for the final relegation place occurred between FC Linz and SV Ried, which saw SV Ried win 3–0 over two legs, thereby relegating FC Linz to the Austrian First League and promoting Ried into the Bundesliga.

Teams and location

Teams of 1994–95 Austrian Football Bundesliga
FC Admira/Wacker
Austria Salzburg
Austria Wien
LASK
FC Linz
VfB Mödling
Rapid Wien
Sturm Graz
Tirol Innsbruck
Vorwärts Steyr

League standings

Results
Teams played each other four times in the league. In the first half of the season each team played every other team twice (home and away), and then did the same in the second half of the season.

First half of season

Second half of season

Top goalscorers

Austria Salzburg's Team 
Otto Konrad, Herbert Ilsanker – Christian Fürstaller, Leo Lainer, Peter Artner, Wolfgang Feiersinger – Thomas Winklhofer, Hermann Stadler, Franz Aigner, Adi Hütter, Tomislav Kocijan, Mladen Mladenović, Arnold Freisegger, Martin Hiden – Heimo Pfeifenberger, Martin Amerhauser, Nikola Jurčević, Eduard Glieder, Ralph Hasenhüttl, Klaus Dietrich, Dean Računica, Helmut Rottensteiner, Gerhard Struber – Manager: Otto Barić

Relegation play-offs 

|}

First League

Top goalscorers

Regional Leagues

Literature 
 Josef Huber: Tagebuch des Jahrhunderts, Fußball-Österreich von 1901 bis 2000, Verlag Wolfgang Drabesch, Wien 2000

References 
 rsssf.com - 1994/95 Season

External links 
 austriasoccer.at

Austrian Football Bundesliga seasons
Aust
1994–95 in Austrian football